Koya Dam is a dam in the Nagano Prefecture, Japan, completed in 1982.

References 

Dams in Nagano Prefecture
Dams completed in 1982
1982 establishments in Japan